′

Chhiahtlang is an independent village level administration within Serchhip Town, in the Mizoram State of India. It lies between Serchhip and Chhingchhip. It is the biggest village under Tuikum Assembly Constituency. Chhiahtlang is 100 km from Aizawl City. 

Villages in Serchhip district
Serchhip